The following is a list of flags of Cameroon. For more information, see flag of Cameroon.

National flag and state flag

Flags of political parties

Separatist movements flags

Historical flags

See also 
 Flag of Cameroon
 Coat of arms of Cameroon

References 

Cameroon
Flags
Flags